Rhynchina obliqualis is a moth of the family Erebidae first described by Vincenz Kollar in 1844. The type locality is Mussoorie, in the Indian Himalayas.

R. obliqualis had been widely confused with Hypena obacerralis in the past. Hypena masurialis was an unnecessary replacement name for R. obliqualis but most observations under this species name are probably Hypena obacerralis.

Distribution and habitat 
The moth is found across Africa and in parts of the Middle East.

References

Erebidae
Moths of Asia
Moths of Japan
Moths described in 1844